Piyachart Tamaphan, simply known as Matt is a Thai retired professional footballer who played as a left back and He is the currently assistant coach Thai League 2 club Samut Prakan City.

International career
In January 2010, Piyachart was called up by Bryan Robson to play for Thailand in the 2010 King's Cup. In May 2010, Todsapol was called up in a friendly match against South Africa.

International

Honours

Club
Muangthong United
 Thai Premier League (2): 2009, 2012

Bangkok Glass
 Thai FA Cup (1): 2014

PT Prachuap FC
 Thai League Cup (1) : 2019

References

External links
 Piyachart Tamaphan profile at Port website
 

1986 births
Living people
Piyachart Tamaphan
Piyachart Tamaphan
Association football fullbacks
Piyachart Tamaphan
Piyachart Tamaphan
Piyachart Tamaphan
Piyachart Tamaphan
Piyachart Tamaphan
Piyachart Tamaphan
Piyachart Tamaphan
Piyachart Tamaphan
Piyachart Tamaphan
Piyachart Tamaphan
Piyachart Tamaphan